The Republican Nationalist Federal Union (. UFNR; 1910–1917) was a left-republican political party in Catalonia, Spain.

In 1914 UFNR signed a deal with the Radical Party, the "Pact of San Gervasio", seeking to challenge the political hegemony of Regionalist League in Barcelona. The alliance was, however, unsuccessful.

References

Political parties in Catalonia
Republican parties in Spain